"Hi-Ho"/"Good Bye" is the seventh and only double A-side single by Japanese musician hide, released on December 18, 1996. It reached number 8 on the Oricon chart.

The music for "Beauty & Stupid Tokyo Ska Version" is performed by Tokyo Ska Paradise Orchestra. Track 3 is a live version of "Pose" recorded at Yoyogi National Gymnasium on October 20, 1996, the entire concert was released as the live album Psyence a Go Go in 2008. On August 4, 2010, the single was re-released as part of the second releases in "The Devolution Project", which was a release of hide's original eleven singles on picture disc vinyl.

Track listing
All songs written by hide.

Personnel
 hide – vocals, guitar, bass, arranger, producer
 Satoshi "Joe" Miyawaki (ZIGGY) – drums on "Hi-Ho"
 Eiki "Yana" Yanagita (ZEPPET STORE) – drums on "Good Bye"
Personnel per Psyence liner notes.

Cover versions
Yoshiki, hide's former X Japan bandmate, covered "Good Bye" on the 1999 hide tribute album Tribute Spirits. Jamosa covered it for Tribute VI -Female Spirits-, while Zeppet Store recorded a version for Tribute VII -Rock Spirits-. Both albums were released on December 18, 2013. "Good Bye" was covered by Cocco for the June 6, 2018 Tribute Impulse album.

References

External links

1996 singles
Ska songs
Hide (musician) songs
Songs written by hide (musician)
1996 songs